Renvyle or Rinvyle is a peninsula and electoral division in North-West Connemara in County Galway, close to the border with County Mayo in Ireland.

History
The ruins of the castle of Grace O'Malley (Gráinne Mhaol) can be found on the peninsula's western fringe. Close by, in Cashleen, is the ruined medieval Church of the Seven Daughters which was named after the Seven Sisters of Renvyle who preached in the area.

Geography

Renvyle is surrounded on three sides by the Atlantic Ocean and by the Dawros river on the other side. It contains the villages of Tully and Tully Cross. Renvyle is situated in the parish of Ballinakill and historically was part of the barony of Ballynahinch. The villages of Leenane and Letterfrack are close by and Clifden is the nearest town, lying  12 miles (9 km) to the south.

The peninsula is dominated by Letter Hill (also known as Tully Mountain) which is 356m high. The Twelve Bens Mountains are also visible, as is Mweelrea, the largest mountain in Connacht. The islands of Inishturk, Inishbofin, Crump, and Freachoileán lie off the rugged coastline.

Amenities
Located in a tourist area, local facilities include a pharmacy, three primary schools, several hotels and B&Bs, a post office, supermarket and other shops, church, community centre, credit union, several pubs, horse-riding, golf course and a crèche. Several festivals take place in the area including the Connemara Mussel Festival, Bog Week and Sea Week.

Kylemore Abbey is also two miles away and was the main place of education for teenage girls in the area until it was closed (as a school) in 2010. Secondary school students now generally attend Clifden Community School or Coláiste Naomh Feichín, Corr na Móna. There are three national schools in the area, namely Eagle's Nest NS, Tully NS and Lettergesh NS.

Renvyle GAA, Gráinne Mhaoils and West Coast United are some of the sporting teams based in the vicinity.

Renvyle House 
Renvyle House, now a hotel, is situated in Rusheenduff in West Renvyle. It was originally single storey, with an extra storey added in the mid-19th century. The timber used in the building of the house extension was said to have been from a shipwreck in the bay. It was initially the home of the Anglo-Irish Blake family who were landlords and owned the peninsula as far as Lettergesh East in the 19th century. The house was sold before the Irish War of Independence to surgeon, poet, novelist and senator Oliver St. John Gogarty. It was burned to the ground during the Irish Civil War in 1923 by the anti-Treaty IRA, as were many other homes of Irish Free State supporters. The house was rebuilt by Gogarty as a hotel in the 1930s.

One of Marconi's first radio receiving stations was built at Tooreena on the peninsula and operated for a short time.

References

External links
 

Towns and villages in County Galway